La Bayou was a  casino located on the Fremont Street Experience in Downtown Las Vegas, Nevada.

The casino had  of gaming space with 125 slot machines. By the time of its closing, La Bayou was one of the few casinos in Las Vegas where slot machines paid out in coins, rather than vouchers.

History

Northern Club: 1920-43
The business opened in 1913 as the Las Vegas Coffee House.

In 1920 Mayme Stocker renamed it the Northern Club, offering liquor and gambling when both were illegal, during the Prohibition era. "Northern" was a well-known code word among railroad workers for an establishment serving alcohol.

On March 20, 1931, the Northern Club received the first Nevada gaming license. This was also the first gaming license issued to a woman, Mayme Stocker.

By 1941, Bugsy Siegel and Dave Stearns were operating the club.

Turf Club, Monte Carlo Club, 1940s-1960s
In 1943, Turf Club replaced Northern Club. It ran only until 1945 when Wilbur Clark leased the club, renaming it the Monte Carlo Club.  The Stockers continued to run the Northern Hotel on the second floor until 1949. Monte Carlo Club would close in 1956, but remain in business as a bar until the 1960s. The original building was razed after 1965. A new building was erected, where a Denny's diner opened c. 1967–1968, followed by Sam's Roast Beef c. 1968–1969.

Coin Castle: 1970-99
By 1970, the site was operating as the Coin Castle. Herb Pastor was approved to take over the Coin Castle and the nearby Golden Goose casino in 1977. Pastor would later also own the nearby Sassy Sally's casino and the Girls of Glitter Gulch strip club.

La Bayou: 1999-2016
Pastor decided in 1999 to move ahead with a renovation plan to transform the Coin Castle and Sassy Sally's into La Bayou and Mermaids, respectively, for a total of $6 million.

In 2006, Pastor's son, Steve Burnstine, purchased the two casinos and the strip club.

Closing: 2016
In April 2016, Derek and Greg Stevens, owners of the neighboring Golden Gate and Las Vegas Club casinos, purchased the three properties, and announced that the businesses would close on June 27.  It was razed soon after. The Golden Gate's expansion into the former space opened at noon on August 25, 2017.

References

Defunct casinos in the Las Vegas Valley
Downtown Las Vegas
Buildings and structures in Las Vegas
1931 establishments in Nevada
2016 disestablishments in Nevada
Buildings and structures demolished in 2017
Demolished buildings and structures in Nevada